The Rewrite is a 2014 American romantic comedy film written and directed by Marc Lawrence. It stars Hugh Grant as a washed-up screenwriter who begins teaching at Binghamton University, and Marisa Tomei as a single mother with whom the screenwriter finds romance. It began development at Castle Rock Entertainment in October 2012, and filming began in New York in April 2013.

The film received mixed reviews from critics.

Plot
Keith Michaels is a divorced and depressed screenwriter whose only successful work was Paradise Misplaced, which won the Best Screenplay Award fifteen years ago. Unemployed and low on funds after a long period of unsuccessful pitching, he reluctantly takes up a job teaching screenwriting at Binghamton University in Upstate New York.

On arrival, Keith angers fellow professor Mary Weldon with derogatory comments about Jane Austen and other misogynistic behavior; he also strikes up an unethical relationship with a young undergraduate student, Karen Gabney, which ends quickly. Keith also does not believe in the concept of teaching and is scornful of his job, as exemplified by his selecting mostly women students for his class based solely on their appearance and then dismissing the class for a month.

After being publicly challenged by an outraged Karen about his competence, Keith starts to devote more time and effort to coaching his students and helping them discover their passion and improve their writing; he finds great potential in Clem Ronson, a shy and awkward nerd, whose script quickly garners the interest of Keith’s agent, Elle. 

Keith also forms a friendship with mature student Holly Carpenter, a single mother of two who is in a steady but unloving relationship. They often disagree on their perspectives on life, where Keith believes that nothing will salvage his failing career or mend his relationship with his estranged son Alex, whereas Holly maintains an optimistic outlook on life and believes that with effort, talents can be developed and problems can be solved. Despite their differences, Keith finds enlightenment in Holly’s advice and makes the first move in contacting Alex.

However, Keith’s problems worsen when his outline for Paradise Misplaced II gets rejected and he faces expulsion from the school after his short-lived relationship with Karen is exposed. In frustration, Keith gets into an argument with Holly and decides to leave the school. As a last parting gesture, he accompanies Clem to Manhattan to meet with Hollywood film producers. Halfway through the meeting, Keith has an epiphany about how he has helped his students and, leaving a newly confident Clem to resume the meeting by himself, he heads back to Binghamton to save his job — which he manages to do with a sincere apology to Professor Weldon. 

In a revelation of his renewed priorities, Keith expresses admiration for Holly’s determination in life and they show a mutual interest in each other. He also declines Elle's invitation to return to Hollywood, as he has decided to stay in Binghamton to teach and write a screenplay based on his experience there; and he tells Elle not to call during class hours.

Keith is welcomed back warmly by his students and apologizes to them for the confusing almost leaving, and then coming back. The film ends with Keith's phone flashing with a voicemail from Alex.

Cast
 Hugh Grant as Keith Michaels
 Marisa Tomei as Holly Carpenter
 Bella Heathcote as Karen Gabney
 Allison Janney as Mary Weldon
 J. K. Simmons as Dr. Hal Lerner
 Chris Elliott as Jim Harper
 Aja Naomi King as Rosa Tejeda
 Karen Pittman as Naomi Watkins
 Steven Kaplan as Clem Ronson
 Annie Q. as Sara Liu
 Caroline Aaron as Ellen
 Olivia Luccardi as Chloe
 Jason Antoon as Greg Nathan
 Damaris Lewis as Maya
 Andrew Keenan-Bolger as Billy Frazier

Production 

The Rewrite is written and directed by Marc Lawrence, with development becoming at Castle Rock Entertainment. In October 2012, Hugh Grant was cast in the film's starring role, marking the fourth collaboration between Lawrence and Grant: Two Weeks Notice, Music and Lyrics, and Did You Hear About the Morgans?. Grant said, "I love Marc's stuff, and [The Rewrite] made me laugh. [I wasn't interested] in the sort of marketed, Hallmark, 'Valentine's Day' sense — I find that repugnant. Here, the romantic comedy part of it is only a small part; it's about this broken guy who mends himself."

In November 2012, Marisa Tomei entered negotiations to star opposite Grant. In the following March, Bella Heathcote joined the cast. Variety reported, "This film would give Heathcote some lighter material after breaking out in serious projects," referring to In Time and Not Fade Away. Later in the month, Allison Janney, J. K. Simmons, and Chris Elliott joined the cast.

Filming began in New York in April 2013. Several scenes were shot at Binghamton University on August 3, 2013.

Release
FilmNation Entertainment handled sales of The Rewrites distribution in territories outside the United States. The University of Binghamton held screenings of the film on February 7 and 8, 2015.

Critical response
On review aggregation website Rotten Tomatoes, the film has an approval rating of 66% based on 62 reviews, with an average rating of 6/10. The site's critical consensus reads, "The Rewrite'''s unremarkable plot is enlivened considerably by its likable cast, adding up to a comedy that coasts capably on the charms of Hugh Grant and his co-stars." On Metacritic, which assigns a weighted average rating, the film has a score 51 out of 100, based on 17 critics, indicating "mixed or average reviews".The Hollywood Reporters Elizabeth Kerr said The Rewrite was not groundbreaking as a romantic comedy but that "it is a pleasant diversion for fans of the form". Kerr considered the film an improvement from Did You Hear About the Morgans? (2009) and said while it was initially similar to Liberal Arts'' (2012) with "its aggressive academic and literary tone", it fell back on romantic comedy conventions. She found that Grant "embraces his maturity" as an older version of his typical character but that Tomei's character was "painfully underwritten". Kerr said the supporting characters would have been forgettable if the actors were not so strong.

References

External links
 
 

2014 films
2014 romantic comedy films
American romantic comedy films
Castle Rock Entertainment films
2010s English-language films
Films about educators
Films about screenwriters
Films directed by Marc Lawrence
Films with screenplays by Marc Lawrence
Films set in New York (state)
Films set in universities and colleges
Films shot in New York (state)
Films shot in New York City
2010s American films